The Missouri Pacific Railroad Depot is a historic train station building on Old Arkansas Highway 9 in the hamlet of Sylamore, Arkansas. It is a rectangular wood-frame structure, covered with a hip roof, that has a projecting telegrapher's bay on one of its long sides. Built  when the railroad was built through the area, it served as a passenger depot until service was ended in 1960.

The building was listed on the National Register of Historic Places in 2004.

See also
National Register of Historic Places listings in Izard County, Arkansas

References

Railway stations on the National Register of Historic Places in Arkansas
Transportation in Izard County, Arkansas
National Register of Historic Places in Izard County, Arkansas
Former Missouri Pacific Railroad stations
Railway stations in the United States opened in 1905
Railway stations closed in 1960
Former railway stations in Arkansas